Javanese people have various systems for naming. Some Javanese, especially those from older generations, have only one name and no surname. Others use their father's names as well as their own, in a similar manner to European patronymics. For example, Abdurrahman Wahid's name is derived from Wahid Hasyim, his father, an independence fighter and minister.  In turn, Wahid Hasyim's name was derived from his father named Hasyim Asyari, a cleric and founder of the Nahdlatul Ulama organization. Another example is former President Megawati Sukarnoputri; the last part of the name is a patronymic, meaning "Sukarno's daughter".

Culturally, Javanese people use a patrilineal system that traces the hierarchic lineage of the father. This system is particularly used to determine descendants' rights to use royal titles before their names. However, it is not customary for Javanese to pass on a family name, except in Suriname, which has a large Javanese population. Surnames in Suriname Javanese are usually derived from the names of their ancestors who emigrated from Java between 1890 and 1939.  Suriname Javanese people usually used Western (mostly Dutch) given names, and Javanese surnames, many of which are archaic in Java itself. The examples of Suriname Javanese surnames are Atmodikoro, Bandjar, Dasai, Hardjoprajitno, Irodikromo, Kromowidjojo, Moestadja, Pawironadi, Redjosentono, Somohardjo, etc. Other Javanese communities who have surnames are the Jatons (Jawa Tondano/Tondano Javanese), descendants of Prince Diponegoro's followers exiled to North Sulawesi. Some of their surnames are Arbi, Baderan, Djoyosuroto, Guret, Kiaidemak, Modjo, Ngurawan, Pulukadang, Suratinoyo, Wonopati, Zees, etc.

Some Javanese, especially those from older generations, have a single name; for example, Sukarno, Suharto, and Boediono. Some names are derived from native Javanese language, while some others are derived from Sanskrit. Names with the prefix Su-, which means good, are very popular. After the advent of Islam, many Javanese used Arabic names, especially those amongst clerics and the northern coast population, where Islamic influence is stronger. There are many Javanese-style Arabic names such as Marpuah (from Marfu'ah), Ngabdurohman  (from Abdurrahman), Sarip (from Sharif), Slamet (from Salamah), Solikin (from Salihin), etc.

It is also noteworthy that names based on religious connotations sometimes doesn't necessarily means that the person (or their parents) adherents of said religion, such as Christians/Muslims with Hindu names (e.g. Wisnu, a common male name, Giring Ganesha, etc.), Muslims/Hindu/Buddhist with Christian sounding names (e.g. Kristiani Herrawati), or Buddhist/Hindu/Christian with Muslim/Arabic names (e.g. Sulaiman, Hassan, and other common Arabic names), as many Javanese (and Indonesians to a larger degree) took inspirations from various cultural sources.

In the past, commoners usually had only one-word names, while nobles had names of two or more words but rarely used a surname. Due to the influence of other cultures, many started using names from other languages, mainly European. Catholic Javanese usually use Latin baptismal names followed by a traditional Javanese name, for example Albertus Soegijopranoto, the first Indonesian bishop. Albertus is his baptismal name, while Soegijopranoto is his traditional Javanese given name.

Until recently, there is no obligation to have a family name in Indonesia. However, it has become more popular for Javanese parents to give family names for their children. The family names are derived from paternal given names.

See also

 Indonesian names

External links
  Javanese girl names
 https://web.archive.org/web/20051225081222/http://www.geocities.com/omimachifuri/names.htm
 https://web.archive.org/web/20050621083127/http://www.kampungnet.com.sg/modules.php?op=modload&name=Subjects&file=index&req=viewpage&pageid=60

Indonesian names
Javanese culture
Names by culture